William de Mattia (born 28 April 1983), commonly known as Dema, is a Brazilian football coach and former player who played as a midfielder. He is the current head coach of Treze.

References
 http://www.veikkausliiga.com/ennatykset_index.htm 

1983 births
Living people
Brazilian footballers
People from Criciúma
Figueirense FC players
Xanthi F.C. players
Santa Cruz Futebol Clube players
Porin Palloilijat players
Tampere United players
Helsingin Jalkapalloklubi players
FC Haka players
Myllykosken Pallo −47 players
Super League Greece players
Veikkausliiga players
Brazilian expatriate sportspeople in Greece
Expatriate footballers in Greece
Brazilian expatriate sportspeople in Finland
Expatriate footballers in Finland
Brazilian expatriate footballers
Association football midfielders
Brazilian football managers
Sportspeople from Santa Catarina (state)
Grêmio Esportivo Anápolis managers
Treze Futebol Clube managers